The Canadair CF-104 Starfighter (CF-111, CL-90) is a modified version of the Lockheed F-104 Starfighter supersonic fighter aircraft built in Canada by Canadair under licence. It was primarily used as a ground attack aircraft, despite being designed as an interceptor. It served with the Royal Canadian Air Force (RCAF) and later the Canadian Armed Forces (CAF) until it was replaced by the McDonnell Douglas CF-18 Hornet.

Design and development
In the late 1950s, Canada redefined its role in the North Atlantic Treaty Organization (NATO) with a commitment to a nuclear strike mission. At the same time, the RCAF began to consider a replacement for the Canadair F-86 Sabre series that had been utilized as a NATO day fighter. An international fighter competition involved current types in service as well as development, including the Blackburn Buccaneer, Dassault Mirage IIIC, Fiat G.91, Grumman Super Tiger, Lockheed F-104G Starfighter, Northrop N-156 and the Republic F-105 Thunderchief. Although the RCAF had preferred the F-105 Thunderchief equipped with an Avro Canada Orenda Iroquois engine, eventually the choice for a strike-reconnaissance aircraft revolved around cost as well as capability. 

A Canadian government requirement for an aircraft that could be manufactured in Canada under licence also favoured the Lockheed proposal, due to a collaboration with Canadair based in Montreal. On 14 August 1959, Canadair was selected to manufacture 200 aircraft for the RCAF under licence from Lockheed. In addition, Canadair was contracted to manufacture wingsets, tail assemblies and rear fuselage sections for 66 Lockheed-built F-104Gs destined for the West German Air Force.

Canadair's internal designation was CL-90 while the RCAF's version was initially designated CF-111, then changed to CF-104. Although basically similar to the F-104G, the CF-104 was optimized for the nuclear strike/reconnaissance role, fitted with R-24A NASARR equipment dedicated to the air-to-ground mode only as well as having provision for a ventral reconnaissance pod equipped with four Vinten cameras. Other differences included retaining the removable refuelling probe, initial deletion of the fuselage-mounted 20 mm (.79 in) M61A1 cannon (replaced by an additional fuel cell) and the main undercarriage members being fitted with longer-stroke liquid springs and larger tires. The first flight of a Canadian-built CF-104 (s/n 12701) occurred on 26 May 1961. The Canadair CF-104 production was 200 aircraft with an additional 140 F-104Gs produced for Lockheed.

Operational history

The CF-104 entered Canadian service in March 1962. Originally designed as a supersonic interceptor aircraft, it was used primarily for low-level strike and reconnaissance by the RCAF. Eight CF-104 squadrons were originally stationed in Europe as part of Canada's NATO commitment. This was reduced to six in 1967, with a further reduction to three squadrons in 1970. Up to 1971, this included a nuclear strike role that would see Canadian aircraft armed with US-supplied nuclear weapons in the event of a conflict with Warsaw Pact forces. During its service life the CF-104 carried the B28, B43 and B57 nuclear weapons.

When the CAF later discontinued the strike/reconnaissance role for conventional attack, the M61A1 was refitted, along with U.S. Snakeye "iron" bombs, British BL755 cluster bombs and Canadian-designed CRV-7 rocket pods. Although Canadian pilots practised air combat tactics, AIM-9 Sidewinder missiles were never carried operationally by Canadian Starfighters (however, examples provided to other air forces, such as Norway and Denmark, did carry Sidewinders on a twin-rail centreline station and the wingtip rails). The CF-104D two-seater did not normally carry any armament except for a centreline practice-bomb dispenser.

There were 110 class A accidents in the 25 years that Canada operated the CF-104 resulting in 37 pilot fatalities. Most of these were in the early part of the program centring on teething problems. Of the 110 class A accidents, 21 were attributed to foreign object damage (14 of which were bird strikes), 14 were due to in-flight engine failures, six were as a result of faulty maintenance and nine involved mid-air collisions. Thirty-two aircraft struck the ground flying at low level in poor weather conditions. Of the 37 fatalities, four were clearly attributable to systems failures; all of the others were attributable to some form of pilot inattention.

The accident rate of the CF-104 compares favourably to its predecessor, the F-86 Sabre. In only 12 years of operation the F-86 had 282 class A accidents with a loss of 112 pilots. The Sabre was also a simpler aircraft and was normally flown at higher altitude.

The CF-104 was nicknamed the "Widowmaker" by the press but not by the pilots and crews of the aircraft. David Bashow states on page 92 of his book "I never heard a pilot call it the Widowmaker". Sam Firth is quoted on page 93 in Bashow's book "I have never heard a single person who flew, maintained, controlled, or guarded that aircraft of any force (and that includes the Luftwaffe) call it the Widowmaker". The pilots did refer to it, in jest, as the "Aluminium Death Tube", "The Lawn Dart" and "The Flying Phallus" but generally called it the 104 (one oh four) or the Starfighter.

Low level attack runs in the CF-104 were done visually at 100 feet AGL and at speeds up to 600 kn. Low level evasive maneuvers could increase speeds to supersonic.

The aircraft was very difficult to attack owing to its small size, speed, and low altitude capability. Dave Jurkowski, former CF-104 and CF-18 pilot is quoted "Because of our speed, size and lower level operations, no Canadian Zipper driver was ever 'shot down' by either air or ground threats in the three Red Flag Exercises in which we participated."

The CF-104 was very successful in operational exercises held by NATO. The Canadians first took part in the AFCENT Tactical Weapons meet in 1964 and did so every year after that. This meet was a competition between squadrons from Belgium, France, Germany, the United States, Britain, and the Netherlands. Scores were based on several factors. Bomb accuracy, time on target, navigation, mission planning and aircraft serviceability. Pilots were chosen at random from the various squadrons to accurately represent operational capabilities.

AFCENT Tactical Weapons Meet (strike era) 
 1964: (first participation) Best team went to the 2 Canadians taking part.
 1965: Best Nation went to the Canadians, Top individual score went to F/L Frioult of 427.
 1966: RCAF was second best Nation, Top individual score went to F/L Morion of 421.
 1967: RCAF best team, McCallum and Rozdeba received awards
 1968: Second Best Team (427)
 1970: Canadians were 1st in strike event.

AFCENT Tactical Weapons Meet (attack era) 
biennial schedule.
 1974: (first participation) Top attack pilot Canadian Larry Crabb
 1976: 1CAG - Highest scoring nation
 1978: The meet was renamed the Tactical Air Meet the scoring was marred by squabbles and announced a tie.
 1980: The Canadians did "well"
 1982 onward: the meet was changed to a non-competitive setup.

Royal Flush 
A competition for Recce squadrons. The Canadians first took part in 1966 and managed the following awards:

 1968: First place.
 1969: First and Second place (441, 439)
 1970: 439 won the day competition. (Canada had no IR equipment)

Tiger Meet 
A competition between NATO squadrons with cat mascots.

 1979: Silver Tiger Trophy
 1981: Silver Tiger Trophy
 1985: Silver Tiger Trophy

In the late 1970s, the New Fighter Aircraft program was launched to find a suitable replacement for the CF-104, as well as the McDonnell CF-101 Voodoo and the Canadair CF-5.  The winner of the competition was the CF-18 Hornet, which began to replace the CF-104 in 1982.  All of the CF-104s were retired from service by the Canadian Forces by 1987, with most of the remaining aircraft given to Turkey.

Variants

CF-104Single-seat fighter-bomber version for the RCAF.
CF-104D Two-seat training version for the RCAF.

Operators

 Royal Canadian Air Force
 Canadian Forces

 Royal Danish Air Force

 Royal Norwegian Air Force

 Turkish Air Force

Accidents and incidents
On 22 May 1983, during an airshow at the Rhein-Main Air Base, a Canadian CF-104 Starfighter crashed onto a nearby road, hitting a car and killing all passengers, a vicar's family of five. The pilot was able to eject.

Aircraft on display

Canada
 F-104A, Royal Canadian Air Force 12700 used as a pattern aircraft for the CF-104 model - Canada Aviation and Space Museum
 CF-104, Royal Canadian Air Force 12702 - pedestal monument, Cold Lake South, Alberta located in Joe Heffner Memorial Park.
 CF-104, Royal Canadian Air Force 12703 - Canadian Starfighter Museum
 CF-104, Royal Canadian Air Force 12704 - Fuselage only - restoration project Montreal Aviation Museum - Restoration not yet started

 CF-104, Royal Canadian Air Force 104783 - Atlantic Canada Aviation Museum
 CF-104, Royal Canadian Air Force 104784 - CFB St-Jean-sur-le-Richelieu 
 CF-104D, Canadian Armed Forces 104646 at the National Air Force Museum of Canada, CFB Trenton
 CF-104, Royal Canadian Air Force 104731 - Comox Air Force Museum
 CF-104 and CF-104D RCAF 104756 and 104641 - Canadian Warplane Heritage Museum in Hamilton, Ontario. 104756 is in Tiger Meet colours. This aircraft was originally 12790.
CF-104, Canadian Armed Forces 104774 at CFB Valcartier
 CF-104D RCAF 104651 Alberta Aviation Museum in Edmonton, Alberta
 CF-104D - Canadian Museum of Flight, Langley Regional Airport
 CF-104, Royal Canadian Air Force 104763 - Reynolds Alberta Museum in Wetaskawin, Alberta. Painted in 417 Squadron close-out ceremony colours.

Denmark 
 CF-104 Royal Danish Airforce R-814 104814, Display. Egeskov Castle, Denmark

Germany 
 CF-104, Canadian Armed Forces 104785, pedestal mount, Söllingen, Germany.,

Hungary
 CF-104 Turkish Air Force 63-893 on display at Szolnok Aviation Museum in Szolnok.

Norway

CF-104D RNoAF 717 -  Displayed on a pedestal outside Flyhistorisk Museum, Sola near Stavanger.
CF-104D RNoAF 730 -  Displayed at the Flyhistorisk Museum, Sola near Stavanger.
CF-104 RNoAF 755 - At Kjeller, Lillestrøm.
CF-104D RNoAF 766 - Displayed on pedestal in front of Kjeller Air Station, Lillestrøm.
CF-104 RNoAF 801 - Displayed at the Norwegian Air Museum in Bodø.
CF-104 RNoAF 836 - Given to Bardufoss High School. Displayed outside Bardufoss Air Station.
CF-104 RNoAF 882 - Displayed as gatekeeper at Volvo Arero Norway, Kongsberg.
CF-104 RNoAF 886 - Privately owned at Rudshøgda, Hamar.
CF-104 RNoAF 889 - At Torp Airport, Sandefjord.

Surviving aircraft

Norway
 CF-104D cn. 104 637 has been restored to flying condition by a group of volunteers called Friends of Starfighter, and is based at Bodø in Norway.

United States
 CF-104D, Canadian Armed Forces 104632 - based at Starfighters Inc in Cape Canaveral, Florida.
 CF-104D, Canadian Armed Forces 104633 - operated by private owner under the company Fuel Fresh Inc. in Phoenix, Arizona.
 CF-104G, Canadian Armed Forces 104759 - based at Starfighters Inc in Cape Canaveral, Florida.
 CF-104G, Canadian Armed Forces 104850 - based at Starfighters Inc in Cape Canaveral, Florida.

Specifications (CF-104)

Badges

See also

References

Notes

Citations

Bibliography

 Bashow, David L. Starfighter: A Loving Retrospective of the CF-104 Era in Canadian Fighter Aviation, 1961-1986. Stoney Creek, Ontario: Fortress Publications Inc., 1990. .
 Francillon, R. J. Lockheed Aircraft Since 1913. London: Putnam, 1987. .
 Greenhous, Brereton and Hugh A. Halliday. Canada's Air Forces, 1914–1999. Montreal: Editions Art Global and the Department of National Defence, 1999. .
 McIntyre, Robert. CF-104 Starfighter (Canadian Profile: Aircraft No. 1). Ottawa, Ontario: Sabre Model Supplies Ltd., 1985. .
 Pickler, Ron and Larry Milberry. Canadair: The First 50 Years. Toronto: CANAV Books, 1995. .
 Stachiw, Anthony L. CF-104 Starfighter (Aircraft in Canadian Service). St. Catharine's, Ontario: Vanwell Publishing Limited, 2007. .

External links

The International F-104 Society
Canadian Forces Historical Aircraft - CF-104
CF-104 at RCAF.com
Starfighters F-104 Demo team
Norwegian site with CF-104D restoration for flight
Canadair CF-104 Starfighter
Lockheed CF-104D Starfighter
Canada's Nuclear Strike Force: 1st Air Division 1964-1972

CF-104
1960s Canadian fighter aircraft
Single-engined jet aircraft
Lockheed F-104 Starfighter
Nuclear weapons of Canada
Mid-wing aircraft
T-tail aircraft
Aircraft first flown in 1961
Canada–United States military relations